Shower trains or bathing trains were specialized trains or train cars used throughout Europe to provide bathing facilities to troops stationed along the battlefront during the First World War.

Switzerland

Shower trains (known as Armeebadezug) were used in Switzerland. Each train consisted of old rolling stock from private railway companies: a locomotive, a tank car and converted passenger cars, each with a shower room and two cloakrooms. The water was taken from the tank car and heated by the locomotive.

This train served the thousands of Swiss militia protecting Switzerland's borders.

Imperial Russia 
Similar bathing trains were used in the Russian Empire in 1914.

Notes 

World War I